Polynesian (March 8, 1942 – December 29, 1959) was an American Thoroughbred racehorse and sire.

Background
He was owned by Gertrude T. Widener, of the prominent Widener family of Philadelphia, and bred by her father-in-law Joseph E. Widener at his Elmendorf Farm in Lexington, Kentucky. He was trained by Morris H. Dixon.

Racing career

1944: two-year-old season
At age two, Polynesian lost his first three races, then bucked his shins.

1945: three-year-old season
Back in training at age three, Polynesian won five of his next seven starts, one of which was a division of the Sagamore Stakes.  In the Experimental Free Handicap he came in third to Jeep and Greek Warrior, and fourth in a division of the Wood Memorial won by Hoop Jr.  He skipped the Kentucky Derby (won by Hoop Jr.), instead competing in one mile Withers Stakes where he defeated Pavot. Polynesian then took the mile and three sixteenths second leg of the U.S. Triple Crown series, the Preakness Stakes, in a front running victory. Because of its demanding one and a half miles, Polynesian was not entered in the third leg of the Triple Crown, the Belmont Stakes. Later that year he won the Saranac Handicap.

Later career
Polynesian developed into a champion sprinter, winning a number of important sprint races in 1946 and in 1947 and was named the U.S. Champion Sprint Horse. In his last year of racing, he went through a streak of five wins, 10 seconds, and 10 thirds.

Stud career
Retired to stud duty, Polynesian sired 37 stakes winners including one of the greatest horses in American racing history, Native Dancer. Some of Polynesian's offspring were:

At age seventeen, Polynesian Died on December 29, 1959, from colic and was buried at Gallaher Farm in Lexington, Kentucky.

Breeding

References

 Polynesian's pedigree and partial racing stats

1942 racehorse births
1959 racehorse deaths
Racehorses bred in Kentucky
Racehorses trained in the United States
American Champion racehorses
Preakness Stakes winners
Widener family
Thoroughbred family 14-a
Chefs-de-Race